Sergiy Lishchyna (born July 11, 1970, Sieverodonetsk, Ukrainian SSR) is a Ukrainian businessperson. He is the co-owner of the Izovat plant, the Ukrainian Sawmill company, the Kyiv Fanplyt plant, the Kostopil and Lviv plywood plants.

Biography

Early years 
Sergiy Lishchyna was born on July 11, 1970 in Sieverodonetsk. His father — Bogdan Mykolayovych Lishchyna, held the position of general director of the Sieverodonetsk Industrial Association "Azot" in the Luhansk region, was also a People's Deputy of Ukraine of the 1st convocation, and an academician of the Academy of Engineering Sciences of Ukraine (1991).

In 1993, Sergiy Lishchyna graduated from Kharkiv Polytechnic Institute with a master's degree in chemical sciences. He then studied at Durham College, North Carolina, USA.

Career 
In the 1990s, Sergiy Lishchyna got into business: first he sold chemical raw materials to China and South Korea, then he started selling construction materials.

In 1994—2003, he worked in management positions in Ukrainian and foreign companies. He engaged in import, export, and sales of chemical raw materials and materials. In 2003-2014, he was the deputy chairman of the board of JSC "Wooden plates and materials", whose facilities are located in the cities of Kostopil, Rivne Oblast, and Nadvirna, Ivano-Frankivsk Oblast.

In 2006, together with his partners, he founded the company Izovat (TOV "OBIO"), which produces thermal insulation materials (mineral wool from basalt). The main production facilities of the company are located in the city of Zhytomyr. Izovat produces 85,000 tons of mineral wool per year and plans to open a new line with a capacity of another 90,000 tons per year. In 2015, Sergiy Lishchyna became a co-founder and co-owner of the company "Ukrainian Sawmills", which is engaged in the production of lumber. The new IzovatGlass plant is being prepared for operations with more than 30 million euros of investments. 

In 2014, he actively helped the participants of the anti-terrorist operation: he purchased body armor and thermal imaging devices, auto equipment, and other ammunition for the Ukrainian military at the front.

In 2023, The To Help to Win volunteer platform awarded entrepreneur Serhiy Lishchyna for the assistance (₴1.5 mln) provided to the soldiers of the 71st Brigade and a number of other military units, including the 35th Separate Brigade of Marines of the Armed Forces of Ukraine.

Private life 
Sergiy is married. The couple raises three children.

References 

Kharkiv Polytechnic Institute alumni
20th-century Ukrainian businesspeople
1970 births
Living people
21st-century Ukrainian businesspeople
People from Sievierodonetsk